Francisco Rebello de Andrade  (born 15 July 1923) is a Portuguese retired sailor. He won a bronze medal in the Star class at the 1952 Summer Olympics in Helsinki, together with Joaquim Fiúza.

References

External links

1923 births
Living people
Portuguese male sailors (sport)
Sailors at the 1952 Summer Olympics – Star
Olympic sailors of Portugal
Olympic bronze medalists for Portugal
Olympic medalists in sailing
Medalists at the 1952 Summer Olympics
Sportspeople from Lisbon